"Chiquilla" is a song by A.B. Quintanilla Y Los Kumbia All Starz. It is the first single from their debut studio album Ayer Fue Kumbia Kings, Hoy Es Kumbia All Starz. "Chiquilla" reached #7 on "Hot Latin Tracks", #9 on "Latin Regional Mexican Airplay", #26 on "Latin Pop Airplay" and #31 on "Latin Tropical Airplay".

Track listing
 Digital download
 "Chiquilla" – 3:20

Versions
 "Chiquilla (Single Version)" – 3:20
 "Chiquilla (Album Version)" – 3:30
 "Chiquilla (Salsa Version)" – 3:59
 "Chiquilla (Bachata Version)" – 3:08
 "Chiquilla (Portuguese Version)" – 3:22

Charts

References

External links
 "Chiquilla" (Music Video) at YouTube

2006 songs
2006 debut singles
EMI Records singles
Kumbia All Starz songs
Songs written by A. B. Quintanilla
Song recordings produced by A. B. Quintanilla
Spanish-language songs